The 1998 European Wrestling Championships were held in the Greco-Romane style in Minsk 7 – 10 May 1998;   the men's and  the women's  Freestyle style in Bratislava  23 – 25 April 1998.

Medal table

Medal summary

Men's freestyle

Men's Greco-Roman

Women's freestyle

References

External links
Fila's official championship website

Europe
W
European Wrestling Championships
Sports competitions in Bratislava
Sports competitions in Minsk
1998 in European sport